Ampco-Pittsburgh Corporation (American Metal Products Company) is a specialty steel manufacturer headquartered in Downtown Pittsburgh, Pennsylvania.  It is one of several companies to bear the Ampco name, and it should not be confused with the Milwaukee-based copper base alloy producer, Ampco Metal Inc.; the Miami-based cabinetry company; the Swiss aluminum corporation; or the Dallas-based tool company. Ampco was formed in 1929 and is a conglomerate made up of several previously established small steel makers. Five small companies operate under the Ampco umbrella in two different product segments.

About the Company
The Forged and Cast Rolls portion of the corporation includes two companies: Union Electric Steel and Davy Rolling Company.  Union Electric is the world's largest producer of rolled steel, which is used in the cold rolling process of making many metals.  The subsidiary offers a variety of grades of thickness and hardness for the product.  Davy Rolling Company, a former British corporation, creates cast rolls, heavy duty rolls, and specialty rolls.

The Air and Liquid Processing Segment of the company comprises Aerofin, Buffalo Air Handling, and Buffalo Pumps.  Aerofin creates steel coils for use industrially in power plants and oil extraction and commercially in automobiles, and heating/cooling systems.  Under Buffalo Air Handling, metal plating, parts, and fans for huge ventilation and refrigeration systems are manufactured.  Buffalo Pumps is the maker of a variety of pumps for various industries.

In 2008, their chairman & former CEO, Robert Paul, became a minority partner in the Pittsburgh Steelers, purchasing a minority stake in order to keep controlling ownership within the Rooney family. Paul and his family acquired a 16% stake in the team as part of the deal, though the Rooneys will remain as primary owners.

References

External links
 
www.ampcopgh.com Company Web Site
www.aerofin.com Aerofin Web Site
www.buffaloair.com Buffalo Air Web Site
www.buffalopumps.com Buffalo Pumps Web Site

Companies listed on the New York Stock Exchange
Manufacturing companies established in 1929
Manufacturing companies based in Pittsburgh
Steel companies of the United States